Nicolai Hvilshøj Reedtz (born 8 September 1995), better known as dev1ce (pronounced and sometimes spelled as device), is a Danish professional Counter-Strike: Global Offensive player for Astralis. On his first stint in Astralis, he became the first (along with three of his then-teammates) to win 4 majors in CS:GO, and to win 3 majors consecutively. He is regarded as one of the best players of all time, consistently playing at a very high individual level since 2014.

Early life 
Reedtz was born on 8 September 1995 in Vejle, Region of Southern Denmark. He began playing video games when he was a teen with his brother as his talent was immediately noticeable. He was also an exceptional badminton player. In fact, at age 14 the big clubs in Denmark wanted him to play for them. He turned their offers down, citing a knee injury and a higher level of passion for video games. He began his esports career in Counter-Strike: Source, playing for Copenhagen Wolves.

Career

2013 
Reedtz's first official CS:GO debut was with the Swedish team Fnatic as a temporary stand-in in March 2013 in the ESL Major Series One – Spring 2013: Cup #4. After that, he started in the Copenhagen Wolves team with Nico, cajunb, dupreeh and Fetish. He won several small events with Copenhagen Wolves and in the DreamHack Winter 2013, the biggest event in 2013, he finished at fifth to eighth place.

2014 
In February 2014 he was hired by the United Kingdom organization Team Dignitas
with cajunb, dupreeh, Xyp9x and FeTiSh (Fetish was replaced with Karrigan in December 2014). Dev1ce played well with this team but never won first place in any tournament; they often won third place. He claimed the 20th place in a top 20 CS:GO players in the world of 2014.

2015 
In 2015, with the same lineup, they switched to the American organization Team SoloMid (TSM).
Dev1ce started with the new organization and competed in many tournaments and won the top place. He finished the year being number 3 out of the top 20 players in the world on HLTV.org.

2016-2018 
At the end of 2015, dev1ce and teammates separated from Team SoloMid and continued without any organization with the same teammates in the team named Question Mark. In January 2016, they created their own organization called “Astralis”. At the end of 2016, he claimed the 3rd place in top a 20 players in the world of 2016. In 2017, Astralis won the major tournament ELEAGUE Major 2017 and claimed the 1st team ranking in the world in 2017 and have been so throughout most of 2018 on HLTV.org. Device placed #2 in 2018, surpassing GeT_RiGhT's record for the most tournament MVP's earned in a single year (6 in 2013), earning his seventh at the ECS S6 Finals.

2019–present 
Dev1ce won four Major titles with Astralis and two MVP titles at the FACEIT Major: London 2018 and the StarLadder Major: Berlin 2019. On 23 April 2021 he joined Ninjas in Pyjamas (NIP). On 27 October 2022, Reedtz rejoined Astralis on a multi-year deal.

Reedtz was named listed on Forbes 30 Under 30 Europe: Sports & Games in 2020.

References

External links 

Living people
Counter-Strike players
Danish esports players
Reedtz family
People from Vejle Municipality
1995 births
Astralis players